Artemin, also known as enovin or neublastin, is a protein that in humans is encoded by the ARTN gene.

Function 

Artemin is a neurotrophic factor in the glial cell line-derived neurotrophic factor family of ligands which are a group of ligands within the TGF-beta superfamily of signaling molecules. GDNFs are unique in having neurotrophic properties and have potential use for gene therapy in neurodegenerative disease. Artemin has been shown in culture to support the survival of a number of peripheral neuron populations and at least one population of dopaminergic CNS neurons. Its role in the PNS and CNS is further substantiated by its expression pattern in the proximity of these neurons. This protein is a ligand for the RET receptor and uses GFR-alpha 3 as a coreceptor.

Role in Axonal Development 
Artemin, along with other GDNF family of ligands, has been implicated in the structural development and plasticity of several types of neurons, including ventral mesencephalic dopaminergic neurons. Artemin promotes the survival of newly differentiated neurons after they have undergone terminal mitosis. Artemin has also been found to support the survival neurons in later stages of development and can enhance neuron growth better than neural growth factor during later stages of development. Artemin plays an important role in migration, proliferation, and differentiation of sympathetic neurons during development. However, during target innervation, sympathetic neurons become dependent on neural growth factor for survival support.

Unlike other secreted guidance cues during development, artemin acts solely as a chemoattractant and never acts as a chemorepellent. Artemin is expressed in smooth muscle cells and secreted along blood vessels and in cells near sympathetic axonal projections so that the sympathetic axons can reach their target tissue cells.

References

Further reading

External links 
 
 
 

TGFβ domain
Neurotrophic factors